Henry Thomas Godwin (August 19, 1853 – April 11, 1918) was an Ontario farmer and political figure. He represented Elgin East in the Legislative Assembly of Ontario as a Conservative member from 1890 to 1894.

He was born in Bayham, Canada West in 1853, a descendant of early settlers in Elgin County. In 1881, he married Ida Buchner. Godwin served on the county council and was warden in 1889. He died April 11, 1918.

References

External links 
The Canadian parliamentary companion, 1891 JA Gemmill
Member's parliamentary history for the Legislative Assembly of Ontario

1853 births
Progressive Conservative Party of Ontario MPPs
Year of death missing